The Circle in the Square is the third full-length studio album by alternative hip-hop band Flobots. The album was released on August 28, 2012 and peaked at No. 198 on the U.S. Billboard 200 album chart. The Circle in the Square was released by Shanachie Records, unlike their first two albums which were released by Universal Republic. The album's title track, The Circle in the Square, was the only single from the album and was released on the Flobots official YouTube channel on July 11, 2012.

Reception

The Circle in the Square received mixed to positive reviews from critics. On Metacritic, the album holds a score of 66/100 based on 6 reviews, indicating "generally favorable reviews".

Track listing

References

2012 albums
Flobots albums
Shanachie Records albums